Harold James Mitchell (5 January 1898 – 8 February 1983) was an English boxer who competed in the 1924 Summer Olympics. He won the gold medal in the light heavyweight competition after beating Thyge Petersen in the final.

Amateur career
Mitchell was a four-time Amateur Boxing Association champion in the light heavyweight class (1922–25), when boxing out of the Polytechnic Boxing Club.

His legacy
Today, located in the UK, there is a leisure centre that bears his name - the Harry Mitchell Leisure Centre - which has a fully equipped Hammer Strength brand weights gym, a gym that has entry only for women, and classes for badminton, fitness and various other indoor team sports.

References

External links

1898 births
1983 deaths
English male boxers
English Olympic medallists
Light-heavyweight boxers
Boxers at the 1924 Summer Olympics
Olympic boxers of Great Britain
Olympic gold medallists for Great Britain
Olympic medalists in boxing
Medalists at the 1924 Summer Olympics